Roger Forster (fl. 1406–1407) of Lewes, Sussex, was a Member of Parliament for Lewes in 1406 and 1407.

References

14th-century births
15th-century deaths
15th-century English people
English MPs 1406
English MPs 1407
People from Lewes